Mahi Networks was a Petaluma, California-based venture-funded network equipment startup company. It was created in 1999 and acquired by Meriton Networks in 2005. Meriton Networks is now a part of Xtera. Mahi's flagship product, the Mahi Mi7, was a 320 Gbit multi-service switching system. The Mi7 supported both SONET/SDH TDM switching, MPLS/Ethernet switching as well as IP routing. The multi-service capability was achieved by Tiny-Tera based switching fabric.

References 

Information technology companies of the United States
Companies based in Sonoma County, California
Petaluma, California